Srednje Pijavško is a small settlement on the right bank of the Sava River in the Municipality of Krško in eastern Slovenia. The area is part of the traditional region of Lower Carniola and is now included with the rest of the municipality in the Lower Sava Statistical Region.

There is a small chapel-shrine in the settlement. It was built in the late  19th  century.

References

External links
Srednje Pijavško on Geopedia

Populated places in the Municipality of Krško